La conferencia secreta del Toto's Bar is the third studio album by Uruguayan rock band Los Shakers. It was released in December 1968 on the Odeon Pops label. It has been called the Sgt. Pepper's Lonely Hearts Club Band of Latin America.

Composition
According to writer Abril Trigo the album combines "the band's old passions for bossa nova and jazz (what they called calimbo) with popular traditional local genres like tango, candombe, and murga, and includes some powerful arrangements á la John Coltrane and bandoneón solos á la Astor Piazzolla".

Track listing

Personnel
 Hugo Fattoruso - lead vocals, lead guitar, piano, organ, accordion, celeste, percussion
 Osvaldo Fattoruso - backing vocals, rhythm guitar, drums, percussion, shared lead vocals on "La Conferencia Secreta Del Toto's Bar - Mi Tia Clementina (The Secret Toto's Bar Conference - My Aunt Clementine)" and "Mas Largo Que El Ciruela (Higher Than My Tower)"
 Roberto "Pelín" Capobianco - backing vocals, bass guitar, bandoneon, cello, percussion
 Carlos "Caio" Vila - backing vocals, drums, percussion
 Unknown: string and brass instruments

References

External links
 
  statistics, tagging and previews at Last.fm
  at Rate Your Music

1968 albums
Los Shakers albums
Psychedelic pop albums